Caleta Chaihuín (Chaihuín) is a coastal hamlet and rural district in the commune of Corral, Los Ríos Region, Chile. It lies at the mouth of Chaihuín River that flows from the Valdivian Coast Range to the Pacific Ocean. Silt from the river combined with the prevailing coastal current have formed a barrier-bar across the cove creating an estuary. The administration and main entrance to the Valdivian Coastal Reserve lies in Chaihuín.

History
The indigenous inhabitants of the area are Huilliche people.

During the early 1970s Chaihuín was considered a hot-bed of the Revolutionary Left Movement (MIR), but with limited actual anti-government activity.

In 2010 a new ferry service from the town of Corral was inaugurated.

Demographics
In 2017 Caleta Chaihuín had a population of 156 inhabitants up from 36 in 2002.

The rural district of Chaihuín encompasses a larger area than the hamlet itself. Its population has grown from 206 in 1920 to over 800.

Notes and references

External links
  Detailed map of Chaihuín rural district.

Geography of Los Ríos Region
Hamlets in Chile
Populated places in Valdivia Province
Populated coastal places in Chile
Coasts of Los Ríos Region
South American sea lion colonies